This is a list of television programs currently or formerly broadcast by Cartoon Network in the United States. The network was launched on October 1, 1992, and airs mainly animated programming, ranging from action to animated comedy. In its early years, Cartoon Network's programming was predominantly made up of reruns of Looney Tunes, Tom and Jerry, and Hanna-Barbera shows (most notably Scooby-Doo, Yogi Bear, Quick Draw McGraw, The Flintstones, The Jetsons, and Jonny Quest).

Cartoon Network's first original series was The Moxy Show and the late-night satirical animated talk show Space Ghost Coast to Coast. The What a Cartoon! series of showcase shorts brought the creation of many Cartoon Network original series collectives branded as "Cartoon Cartoons" in 1995. Cartoon Network has also broadcast several feature films, mostly animated or containing animated sequences, under its "Cartoon Theater" block, later renamed "Flicks."

Current programming

Original programming

Cartoon Network Studios

Warner Bros. Animation

Acquired programming

Repeats of ended programming

Warner Bros. Animation

Hanna-Barbera Studios Europe

Acquired programming

Cartoonito programming

Original programming

Acquired programming

Upcoming programming

Original programming

Cartoon Network Studios

Warner Bros. Animation

Hanna-Barbera Studios Europe

Live-action & live-action/animated series

Acquired programming

American co-productions

Canadian co-productions

European co-productions

Cartoonito programming

Cartoon Network Studios

Warner Bros. Animation

Hanna-Barbera Studios Europe

Acquired programming

Former programming

Original programming

Cartoon Network Studios / co-productions

Warner Bros. Animation

Hanna-Barbera Studios Europe

Live-action and live-action/animated series

Miniseries

Short series

Syndicated series 

An asterisk (*) indicates that the program initially aired as a Cartoon Network program.

A double-asterisk (**) indicates that the program became a Boomerang program.

A triple-asterisk (***) indicates that the program became an Adult Swim/Toonami program.

A quadruple-asterisk (****) indicates that the program became an HBO Max program.

Acquired programming

Canadian co-productions

European co-productions

Animated

Anime

Live-action and live-action/animated series

Cartoonito programming

Acquired programming

Former specials

Programming blocks

Current programming blocks

Former programming blocks

Pilots

Short format

This is a list of pilot episodes on Cartoon Network, along with their premiere dates for each.

Picked up

Not picked up

Long format
This is a list of pilot movies on Cartoon Network, along with their status and premiere dates for each.

See also
 List of Cartoon Network films
 List of programs broadcast by Cartoonito
 List of programs broadcast by Adult Swim
 List of programs broadcast by Boomerang
 List of programs broadcast by Toonami
 List of Cartoon Network Studios productions
 Hanna-Barbera Studios Europe filmography

Notes

References

Programs
Cartoon Network original programming
Lists of television series by network
Programs